Douglas Bernard Fournet (May 7, 1943 – May 4, 1968) was a United States Army officer and a recipient of the United States military's highest decoration—the Medal of Honor—for his actions in the Vietnam War.

Biography
Born on May 7, 1943, in Kinder, Louisiana, Fournet attended McNeese State University in Lake Charles, Louisiana.

Fournet joined the Army from New Orleans, Louisiana in 1966, and went through Officer Candidate School at Fort Benning. By May 4, 1968, was serving as a first lieutenant in Company B, 1st Battalion, 7th Cavalry Regiment, 1st Cavalry Division (Airmobile). During a firefight on that day, in the A Shau Valley, South Vietnam, during Operation Delaware, Fournet was killed while attempting to disable an enemy Claymore mine. He shielded his fellow soldiers from the blast with his body, preventing serious wounds to everyone but himself. His squadron leader, Bill Krahl, recovered his body, for which Krahl was awarded a Bronze Star.

Killed three days before his 25th birthday, Fournet was buried in the Kinder McRill Cemetery in Kinder, Louisiana. He was survived by his wife Marilyn Grissett, who later remarried, and a son, Bill Fournet, who was born after his father's death.

A portion of Interstate 210 which loops around Lake Charles was named the "Douglas Fournet Expressway" in the fall of 2001. On July 3, 2010, he and four other Medal of Honor recipients with ties to Louisiana were inducted into the Louisiana Military Hall of Fame and Museum in Abbeville.

Medal of Honor citation
First Lieutenant Fournet's official Medal of Honor citation reads:
For conspicuous gallantry and intrepidity in action at the risk of his life above and beyond the call of duty. 1st Lt. Fournet, Infantry, distinguished himself in action while serving as rifle platoon leader of the 2d Platoon, Company B. While advancing uphill against fortified enemy positions in the A Shau Valley, the platoon encountered intense sniper fire, making movement very difficult. The right flank man suddenly discovered an enemy claymore mine covering the route of advance and shouted a warning to his comrades. Realizing that the enemy would also be alerted, 1st Lt. Fournet ordered his men to take cover and ran uphill toward the mine, drawing a sheath knife as he approached it. With complete disregard for his safety and realizing the imminent danger to members of his command, he used his body as a shield in front of the mine as he attempted to slash the control wires leading from the enemy positions to the mine. As he reached for the wire the mine was detonated, killing him instantly. Five men nearest the mine were slightly wounded, but 1st Lt. Fournet's heroic and unselfish act spared his men of serious injury or death. His gallantry and willing self-sacrifice are in keeping with the highest traditions of the military service and reflect great credit upon himself, his unit, and the U.S. Army.

See also
List of Medal of Honor recipients for the Vietnam War
Cemetery Memorial by La-Cemeteries

References

1943 births
1968 deaths
People from Lake Charles, Louisiana
McNeese State University alumni
United States Army officers
American military personnel killed in the Vietnam War
United States Army Medal of Honor recipients
Vietnam War recipients of the Medal of Honor
United States Army personnel of the Vietnam War